Pant-y-Goitre Bridge crosses the River Usk between Abergavenny and Usk near the village of Llanfair Kilgeddin. The bridge carries the B4598. It was constructed in 1821 by the engineer John Upton.

History
The bridge was designed and built in 1821 by John Upton as part of the improvements to the Abergavenny to Usk turnpike road. Upton also undertook other work in the immediate vicinity, including the Llanellen Bridge and churches at Llanvihangel Gobion and Llangattock-juxta-Usk.

Description
The bridge is constructed of ashlar, and has three spans, with spandrel circular voids. The architectural historian John Newman describes the bridge as, "an unusual and handsome design". The bridge is a Grade II* listed structure.

Notes

References
 

Grade II* listed bridges in Wales
Bridges in Monmouthshire
Grade II* listed buildings in Monmouthshire
Scheduled monuments in Monmouthshire
Stone bridges in the United Kingdom
Bridges over the River Usk